Flexuosol A is a resveratrol tetramer found in Vitis flexuosa.

References 

Resveratrol oligomers
Natural phenol tetramers
Grape